Elizabeth Moran may refer to:

Elizabeth Moran (photographer) (born 1984), American artist
Elizabeth Moran (scientist), Irish chemist